Joe Echevarria (born in Mariveles, Bataan, Philippines) was Lightweight/Featherweight champion of the United States Army, United States Navy and of the Philippine Islands in 1929. He was asked to and helped train and fought Sugar Ray Robinson for his first professional fight in Madison Square Garden which he lost to Sugar Ray Robinson by a knockout in the second round on October 4, 1940. He never fought again. Known as "Baby Face Eche or Kid Eche", Echevarria had served in the American Army at Westpoint where he was a cavalry instructor. Josue Reyes Echevarria was the son of Brigadier General Leopoldo Life Echevarria who fought against the Japanese occupation of the Philippines during the First World War.

External links 
Joe Echeverria - Boxer at BoxRec.com

Filipino emigrants to the United States
Sportspeople from Bataan
Lightweight boxers
Featherweight boxers
Year of death unknown
Year of birth missing
American male boxers